Hazara (Hindko: هزاره,) is a region in northeastern Pakistan, falling administratively within Hazara Division of the Khyber Pakhtunkhwa province. It is dominated mainly by the Hindko-speaking Hindkowan people, who are the native ethnic group of the region and often called the "Hazarewal".

History

Name
Evidence from the seventh-century Chinese traveller Xuanzang, in combination with much earlier evidence from the Hindu Itihasa the Mahabharata, attests that Poonch and Hazara District of Kashmir had formed parts of the ancient state of Kamboja, whose rulers followed a republican form of government.

History since Alexander

Alexander the Great and Ashoka the Great
Alexander the Great, after conquering parts of the Northern Punjab, established his rule over a large part of Hazara. In 327 B.C., Alexander handed the area over to Abisaras (Αβισαρης), the raja of Poonch state.

Hazara remained a part of the Taxila administration during the rule of the Maurya dynasty. Ashoka the Great was the governor of the area when he was a prince. After the death of his father Bindusara around 272 B.C., Ashoka inherited the throne and ruled this area as well as Gandhara. Today, the Edicts of Ashoka inscribed  on three large boulders near Bareri Hill serve as evidence of his rule there. The Mansehra rocks record fourteen of Ashoka's edicts, presenting aspects of the emperor's dharma or righteous law, and represent the earliest irrefutable evidence of writing in South Asia. Dating to middle of the third century BC, they are written from right to left in the Kharosthi script.

Hazara has several places of significance for the Hindus related to the Pandavas:

In the 2nd century CE, a mythical king Raja Risalu, son of Raja Salbahan of Sialkot, supposedly brought the area under his control. The local people consider him as a popular folk hero. When a Chinese pilgrim, Hiun-Tsang, visited this area, it was under the control of Raja Durlabhavardhana, the ruler of Kashmir.

The Shahi dynasties ruled Hazara one after another. Among the Hindu Shahi dynasty rulers, Raja Jayapala is the best known. Mehmood of Ghazni defeated Raja Jayapala during his first campaign. However, there is no historical evidence that Mehmood of Ghazni ever visited or passed through Mansehra. After the fall of the Shahi dynasty, in the 11th century, the Kashmiris took control of the area under the leadership of Kalashan (1063 to 1089). From 1112 to 1120, King Susala ruled the area. In the 12th century, Asalat Khan captured this area but soon after Mohammad of Ghor's death the Kashmiris once again regained control of Hazara.

Amb and its surrounding areas of Hazara have a long history which can be traced to Alexander the Great's invasion of India. Arrian, Alexander's historian, did not indicate the exact location of Embolina, but since it is known that Aoronos was on the right bank of the River Indus, the town chosen to serve as Alexander's base of supplies may with good reason be also looked for there. The mention in Ptolemy's Geography of Embolima as a town of Indo-Scythia situated on the Indus supports this theory.

Turkic rule

In 1399, the Turco-Mongol Muslim warrior Timur, on his return to Kabul, stationed his Turkic soldiers (who belonged to a sub-tribe of Turks, called Karlugh Turks) in Hazara to protect the important route between Kabul and Kashmir. By 1472, Prince Shahab-ud-Din came from Kabul and established his rule over the region.

At the beginning of the 18th century, Turkic rule came to an end due to the increased aggression of the Swatis and their allied forces. The most crucial attack was that of the Swatis in collusion with Syed Jalal Baba in 1703. Syed Jalal Shah was the son in law of the last ruler of the Turkic dynasty of Hazara, Sultan Mehmud Khurd. Thus, Swatis ousted the Turks and captured this area during the last part of the 16th and beginning of the 17th century.

Durrani rule
Hazara remained part of the Afghan Durrani Empire from the mid-18th to the early 19th centuries. The Durranis considered it wise to rule the region through the local tribal chiefs. The lower Hazara plain was a separate administrative region attached to the Chacch and Attock areas of Northern Punjab whereas most of upper Hazara was attached to the Durrani 'Subah' or governorship of Kashmir, with the exception of the Tanawal Ilaqa (Amb) or area, which paid liege homage or tribute in exchange for comparative independence. This 'Subah' or governorship was ruled by Suba Khan Tanoli during the reign of the Afghan Durrani Empire.

Sikh rule
Hazara came under Sikh rule in 1820 when the region was conquered by the Sikh Empire led by Sikh general Hari Singh Nalwa who was fighting under the Lahore Sikh Emperor Maharaja Ranjit Singh. The region was captured by a Sikh force from Rawalpindi led by general Hari Singh Nalwa. Hazara was one of the most difficult places to get conquered by Hari Singh Nalwa but he eventually succeeded in capturing it. Sikh rule in Hazara was fiercely resisted by the many tribes living in the region such as the Tanolis, Karlal Karlugh Turks, Jadoons, Swatis, Tareens, Dilazaks, Mashwanis, Gujars, Awans, Maliks, Utmanzais and Kheshgis who all played a role in fighting the Sikh administration together. The Turks fought off many Sikhs who had settled in the region and drove them back to Punjab and Rawalpindi.

British rule

After the First Anglo-Sikh War, under the terms of the Treaty of Lahore, the area was governed by Major James Abbott. Abbott managed to secure and pacify the area within a year. During the Second Sikh War Abbott and his men were cut off by the Sikh army from supplies and reinforcements from the rest of the British Army, but were able to maintain their position.

By 1849, the British had gained control of all of Hazara. However, the western Pashtun tribes were occasionally rebellious. These tribes included the Swati clans of Allai, Batagram in the Nandhiar valley, The Black Mountain (Tor Ghar) Tribes. The British sent many expeditions against these tribes to crush several uprisings between 1852 and the 1920s.

The British divided Hazara District into three Tehsils (administrative subdivisions): Mansehra, Abbottabad, and Haripur and annexed it to the Punjab. In 1901, when the North-West Frontier Province (now Khyber Pakhtunkhwa) was formed, Hazara was separated from Punjab and made a part of NWFP.

Hazara Muslim League
From the early 1930s onwards, the people of Hazara gradually became active in the freedom movement for an independent Pakistan under the active leadership of renowned All India Muslim League leaders such as Abdul Majid Khan Tarin of Talokar (1877–1939), an early member of the (then) Frontier Legislative Assembly, and others. Even before the All-India Muslim League, started its movement for Pakistan in 1937, after the historic Lucknow Session of October that year, the Hazara Muslim League was properly formed and convened at the residence of Noor-Ud-Din Qureshi in Abbottabad in 1936. In this meeting, the leaders of the All-India Muslim League, Nawab Bahadur Yar Jang, Maulana Shaukat Ali, Hamid Badayuni, and others came from India. The local people joined the movement in large numbers. In the 1939 elections for the Hazara Muslim League, Khan Jalaluddin Khan was elected as the President of the Hazara Muslim League. During the final phase of the movement for the creation of Pakistan, Captain Sardar Zain Muhammad Khan, OBI, and Khan Jalaluddin Khan Jalal Baba defeated their Congress rivals in the elections of 1946 from their respective rural and urban Constituencies and politically routed the All India Congress from the region. In the Delhi Convention of Muslim League parliamentarians chaired by Muhammad Ali Jinnah, which finally voted for the division of India and the creation of Pakistan, Capt. Sardar Zain Muhammad Khan represented Hazara. These Muslim League Leaders were also able to mobilize the people of this area in favor of the referendum for the creation of Pakistan.

Sometime before the independence of Pakistan in 1947, Nawab Muhammad Farid Khan Tanoli (KBE) of Amb State also developed good relations with Jinnah and Nawabzada Liaqat Ali Khan as a politic move. His correspondence and letters to and from Jinnah are available in Pakistan's archival records.

Independence

During British rule, the region of Hazara had formed part of Punjab province, until the western parts of that province were separated to form the new NWFP. The areas around Abbottabad and Mansehra became the Hazara District of Peshawar Division, whilst areas to the north of this became the Hazara Tribal Agency. Sandwiched between Hazara Tribal Agency and Hazara District were the small princely states of Amb and Phulra. This system of administration continued until 1950, when these two small states were incorporated into the Hazara district.

From 1955 to 1970, NWFP province became part of West Pakistan under the One Unit policy, with the Hazara district forming part of the Peshawar Division of West Pakistan.

The Khyber Pakhtunkhwa Assembly here on 21 March 2014 passed a resolution demanding the creation of the Hazara province.

Geography and climate

Hazara is bounded on east by Azad Kashmir. To the south are the Islamabad Capital Territory and the province of Punjab, whilst to the west and to the north lies the rest of Khyber Pakhtunkhwa. The river Indus runs through the division in a north–south line, forming much of the western border of the division. The total area of Hazara is 18,013 km2.

Because it lies immediately south of the main Himalayan range, and is exposed to moist winds from the Arabian Sea, Hazara is the wettest part of Pakistan. Due to its location on the boundary between the monsoonal summer rainfall regime of East Asia and the winter-dominant Mediterranean climate of West Asia, Hazara has an unusual bimodal rainfall regime, with one peak in February or March associated with frontal southwest cloud bands and another monsoonal peak in July and August.

Due to the high altitude, temperatures in Hazara are cooler than on the plains, though Abbottabad at  still has maxima around 32 °C (90 °F) with high humidity in June and July. Further up, temperatures are cooler, often cooler than the Northern Areas valleys due to the cloudiness. In winter, temperatures are cold, with minima in January around 0 °C (32 °F) and much lower in the high mountains.

Hazara lies close to the crossroads formed by the river Indus and the Grand Trunk Road. The Karakoram Highway begins at the town of Havelian and goes north through the division towards China via Gilgit-Baltistan.

Education
Some districts of Hazara have received high scores in education in Alif Ailaan's 2017 rankings: Haripur District was ranked first in Pakistan, while Abbottabad and Mansehra were in the top three for the province of Khyber Pakhtunkhwa.

Movement for Hazara Province

A movement founded in 1987 by the late Malik Asif Advocate named "Hazara Qaumi Mahaz" (HQM) demands for separate Hazara Province. People of Saraiki areas in south Punjab also raised the voice for separate province by disgraced former Prime Minister Yousuf Raza Gilani similar to Hazarawal peoples.

In April 2010, it was announced that through an amendment in the Constitution of Pakistan, the name of NWFP would be changed to Khyber Pakhtunkhwa leading to protests across the Hazara region under the leadership of late Baba Haider Zaman. The announcement of the new name also led to calls from Hazara for a new separate province. Ten persons died, and nearly two hundred were hurt during the rallies and protest all over Hazara region against NWFP and creation of new province Hazara in April, 2010 and a complete wheel-jam and shutter-down strike was again observed in the Hazara on 2 May 2010, in support of this demand. Large public meetings in this regard, as well as public protests, have been regularly organised by the HQM  (Hazara Quami Mahaz Pakistan) and 'Tehreek I Hazara' movement, since; but the name of the NWF Province has been duly changed to 'Khyber Pakhtunkwha' and is a 'fait accompli'. The leadership of the Hazara movement, however, have vowed to continue their struggle until the achievement of their aims via peaceful and constitutional means.

The Khyber Pakhtunkhwa Assembly on 21 March 2014 passed a resolution demanding the creation of the Hazara province.

Notable people 
Nawab Salahuddin Saeed Khan Tanoli – Last nawab of Amb State and elected five times MNA.
Khan Mohammad Abbas Khan He was a freedom fighter as well as an active member of PML
Ayub Khan – President of Pakistan
Jalal Baba – Federal Minister and Prominent leader of All India Muslim League
Sardar Mohammad Abdul Ghafoor Hazarvi – Founding member of the religious Jamiat Ulema-e-Pakistan party (JUP) and companion of Muhammad Ali Jinnah
Allama Syed Jawad Naqvi Islamic Revolutionary Scholar, religious leader and Quaran interpreter.
Muhammad Muneeb-ur-Rehman – Chairman of Ruet-e-hilal committee, Pakistan
Baba Haider Zaman – Leader of the movement for a separate Hazara province
Asghar Khan – Pakistani Air Force commander, Politician
Anwar Shamim – Chief of Air Staff, Pakistani Air Force
Bashir Jehangiri – Chief Justice of the Supreme Court
Qateel Shifai – Urdu poet
Afzal Khan – actor
Zahirul Islam Abbasi – military officer
Salahuddin Tirmizi- former Corps Commander
Iqbal Khan Jadoon – politician -Chief Minister NWFP
Amanullah Khan Jadoon – politician -Federal Minister
Gohar Ayub Khan – politician
Murtaza Javed Abbasi FMR Deputy Speaker National Assembly of Pakistan 
Yasir Hameed – cricketer
Azam Khan Swati – businessman, politician
Sardar Raza Khan – Election Commissioner of Pakistan
Ali Khan Jadoon – politician

See also 
 Hazara District 
 State of Amb
 Hazara Province Movement
 Hazarewals
 Hazara cricket team

References

Regions of Pakistan
Geography of Khyber Pakhtunkhwa
Proposed provinces and territories of Pakistan

ur:ہزارہ ڈویژن